The 2018 Mississippi Valley State Delta Devils football team represents Mississippi Valley State University in the 2018 NCAA Division I FCS football season. The Delta Devils are led by first-year head coach Vincent Dancy and play their home games at Rice–Totten Stadium as members of the East Division of the Southwestern Athletic Conference (SWAC).

Previous season
The Delta Devils finished the 2017 season 2–9, 1–6 in SWAC play to finish in last place in the East Division.

On November 20, it was announced that head coach Rick Comegy's contract would not be renewed. He finished at Mississippi Valley State with a four-year record of 6–38.

Preseason

SWAC football media day
During the SWAC football media day held in Birmingham, Alabama on July 13, 2018, the Delta Devils were predicted to finish last in the East Division.

Media poll

Presason All-SWAC Team
The Delta Devils had two players selected to Preseason All-SWAC Teams.

Offense
1st team

Quinn McElfresh – Sr. WR

Defense
1st team

Patrick Harbin – Sr. LB

Schedule

Game summaries

at North Dakota

at Jacksonville State

Alcorn State

at Bethune–Cookman

at Jackson State

Arkansas–Pine Bluff

at Texas Southern

at Grambling State

Hampton

Alabama A&M

at Alabama State

References

Mississippi Valley State
Mississippi Valley State Delta Devils football seasons
Mississippi Valley State Delta Devils football